The 1987 Dutch Open was a Grand Prix men's tennis tournament staged at the Melkhuisje in Hilversum, Netherlands. The tournament was played on outdoor clay courts and was held from 27 July until 2 August 1987. It was the 29th edition of the tournament. First-seeded Miloslav Mečíř won the singles title.

Finals

Singles

 Miloslav Mečíř defeated  Guillermo Pérez Roldán 6–4, 1–6, 6–3, 6–2
 It was Mečíř's 6th singles title of the year and the 9th of his career.

Doubles

 Wojciech Fibak /  Miloslav Mečíř defeated  Tom Nijssen /  Johan Vekemans 7–6, 5–7, 6–2

References

External links
 ITF tournament edition details

Dutch Open (tennis)
Dutch Open (tennis)
Dutch Open
Dutch Open
Dutch Open
Dutch Open (tennis), 1987